Southwestern High School is a public high school in Somerset, Kentucky. Operated by Pulaski County Schools, Southwestern opened its doors in the fall of 1993 to alleviate crowding at the district's other high school, Pulaski County High School. It is fed by several schools operated by the Pulaski County district, namely Nancy Elementary, Burnside Elementary, Southern Elementary, Oak Hill Elementary, and Southern Middle School. Students at Science Hill School, a K–8 school operated by a separate district within Pulaski County, have the option of attending either Southwestern or Pulaski County High.

Athletics
Archery (co-ed)
Baseball (boys only)
Basketball (boys and girls, separate teams)
Cheerleading (girls only)
Cross Country (boys and girls, separate teams)
Dance Team (boys and girls)
Football (boys only)
Golf (boys and girls, separate teams)
JROTC (co-ed)
Robotics Team (one team, boys and girls)
Soccer (boys and girls, separate teams)
Softball (girls only)
Swim Team (boys and girls, separate teams)
Track (boys and girls, separate teams)
Tennis (boys and girls, separate teams)
Volleyball (girls only)

Music department

Bands 
Marching band
Symphonic band
Jazz band

References

External links 
 Southwestern High School
 The Commonwealth Journal
 Kentucky High School Athletic Association website

Public high schools in Kentucky
Educational institutions established in 1993
Schools in Pulaski County, Kentucky
1993 establishments in Kentucky
Somerset, Kentucky